Miami Township is one of the nine townships of Montgomery County, Ohio, United States.  As of the 2010 census the population was 50,735.

Geography
Located in the southern part of the county, it borders the following townships and cities:
Moraine - north
Kettering - northeast
Washington Township - east
Clearcreek Township, Warren County - southeast
Franklin Township, Warren County - south
German Township - west
Jefferson Township - northwest

Several cities are located in Miami Township:
Part of Carlisle, in the southwest
Miamisburg, in the center
Part of Springboro, in the southeast
Part of West Carrollton, in the north

The township is highly urbanized in its eastern half, nearest to Miamisburg and Kettering.  Ohio law prohibits townships from collecting income taxes from residents; thus, the township has seen higher growth than incorporated towns nearby.

Name and history
Statewide, other Miami Townships are located in Clermont, Greene, Hamilton, and Logan Counties.

In 1833, Miami Township contained eight gristmills, six saw mills, six distilleries, and one cotton factory.

Economy
Miami Township is home to the American offices of LexisNexis information systems and a regional office of MetLife insurance. It is also home to the area's oldest major shopping area, the Dayton Mall, and it has Southview Hospital, a member of the Kettering Medical Center Network, a Seventh-day Adventist facility.

Government
The township is governed by a three-member board of trustees, who are elected in November of odd-numbered years to a four-year term beginning on the following January 1. Two are elected in the year after the presidential election and one is elected in the year before it. There is also an elected township fiscal officer, who serves a four-year term beginning on April 1 of the year after the election, which is held in November of the year before the presidential election. Vacancies in the fiscal officership or on the board of trustees are filled by the remaining trustees.

Property taxes are used to fund police and fire departments.

Transportation
It lies at a major access point to both Interstate 75 and Interstate 675.

Education
Children from Miami Township attend the schools of Carlisle, Kettering, Miamisburg, or West Carrollton.

Bishop Leibold School, a Catholic school named for Paul Francis Leibold, is partially located in Miami Township. Bishop Leibold School has two campuses: the west campus, preschoolers through third graders attend the west campus in Miamisburg, while fourth through eighth graders attend the east campus in Miami Township. Bishop Leibold School was awarded the National Blue Ribbon Award in 2008. Bishop Leibold has also been working to improve its STEM education and as a result was awarded the Governor's Thomas Edison Award for Excellence in STEM Education each year from 2010 to 2014. In its most recent school year for receiving the award (2013-2014) it was the only Dayton-area grade school to be recognized.

References

External links
Township website
County website

Townships in Montgomery County, Ohio
Townships in Ohio